Altick is a surname. Notable people with the surname include:

Frances Altick (born 1994), American tennis player
Richard Altick (1915–2008), American literary scholar